The Central District of Maneh and Samalqan County is a district (bakhsh) in Maneh and Samalqan County, North Khorasan Province, Iran. At the 2006 census, its population was 44,804, in 11,301 families.  The District has one city: Ashkhaneh.  The District has two rural districts (dehestan): Howmeh Rural District and Jeyransu Rural District.

References 

Districts of North Khorasan Province
Maneh and Samalqan County